Icelandic Christmas folklore depicts mountain-dwelling characters and monsters who come to town during Christmas. The stories are directed at children and are used to scare them into good behavior. The folklore includes both mischievous pranksters who leave gifts during the night and monsters who eat disobedient children.

The figures are depicted as living together as a family in a cave and include:

 Grýla, a giantess with an appetite for the flesh of mischievous children, whom she cooks in a large pot. Her husband Leppalúði is lazy and mostly stays at home in their cave.
 The Yule Cat is a huge and vicious cat who lurks about the snowy countryside during Christmas time (Yule) and eats people who have not received any new clothes to wear before Christmas Eve.
 The Yule Lads are the sons of Grýla and Leppalúði. They are a group of 13 mischievous pranksters who steal from or harass the population and all have descriptive names that convey their favorite way of harassing. They come to town one by one during the last 13 nights before Yule. They leave small gifts in shoes that children have placed on window sills, but if the child has been disobedient they instead leave a rotten potato in the shoe.

These Christmas-related folktales first appeared around the 17th century and displayed some variation based on region and age. In modern times these characters have taken on slightly more benevolent roles.

History

Origins
The first mention of the Yule Lads can be found in the 17th-century Poem of Grýla. Grýla had appeared in older tales as a troll but had not been linked to Christmas before. She is described as a hideous being who is the mother of the gigantic Yule Lads, a menace to children.

Early on, the number and depiction of the Yule Lads varied greatly depending on location. They were used to frighten children into good behaviour, similar to the bogeyman. The King of Denmark objected to their use as a disciplinary tool.

In the late 18th century, a poem mentions 13 of them. In the mid-19th century, author Jón Árnason drew inspiration from the Brothers Grimm and began collecting folktales. His 1862 collection is the first mention of the names of the Yule Lads.

In 1932, the poem "Yule Lads" was published as a part of the popular poetry book Christmas is Coming (Jólin koma) by Icelandic poet Jóhannes úr Kötlum. The poem was popular and established what is now considered the canonical 13 Yule Lads, their names, and their personalities.

Grýla & Leppalúði

Grýla is a giantess, first mentioned in 13th-century texts such as Íslendinga saga and Sverris saga, but not explicitly connected with Christmas until the 17th century. She is enormous and her appearance is repulsive.

The oldest poems about Grýla describe her as a parasitic beggar. She walks around asking parents to give her their disobedient children. Her plans can be thwarted by giving her food or chasing her away. Originally, she lived in a small cottage, but in later poems, she appears to have been forced out of town and into a remote cave.

Current-day Grýla can detect children who are misbehaving year-round. She comes from the mountains during Christmas time to search nearby towns for her meal. She leaves her cave, hunts children, and carries them home in her giant sack. She devours children as her favourite snack. Her favorite dish is a stew of naughty kids, for which she has an insatiable appetite. According to legend, there is never a shortage of food for Grýla.

According to folklore, Grýla has been married three times. Her third husband Leppalúði is said to be living with her in their cave in the Dimmuborgir lava fields, with the big black Yule Cat and their sons. Leppalúði is lazy and mostly stays at home in their cave. Grýla supposedly has dozens of children with her previous husbands, but they are rarely mentioned nowadays.

Yule Cat

The Yule Cat, known as Jólakötturinn, a huge and vicious cat who is described as lurking about the snowy countryside during Christmas time and eating people who have not received any new clothes to wear before Christmas Eve. He is the house pet of Grýla and her sons.

Though referred to as an ancient tradition, written accounts of the Yule Cat have only been located as recently as the 19th century. The threat of being eaten by the Yule Cat was used by farmers as an incentive for their workers to finish processing the autumn wool before Christmas. The ones who took part in the work would be rewarded with new clothes, but those who did not would get nothing and thus be preyed upon by the monstrous cat. The cat has alternatively been described as merely eating away the food of ones without new clothes during Christmas feasts. The perception of the Yule Cat as a man-eating beast was partly popularized by poems of Jóhannes úr Kötlum as with the rest of the folklore.

Yule Lads 

The Yule Lads (sometimes named Yuletide-lads or Yulemen) are the sons of Grýla and Leppalúði. They are a group of 13 mischievous pranksters who steal from or otherwise harass the population. All have descriptive names that generally convey their favourite way of causing mischief. They arrive one by one over the final 13 nights leading up to Christmas (Yule). They leave small gifts in shoes that children place on window sills, but if the child has been disobedient, they leave a rotten potato in the shoe instead.

In modern times the Yule Lads have also been depicted in a more benevolent role<ref name comparable to Santa Claus and other related figures. They are generally portrayed wearing late-medieval Icelandic clothing, but are sometimes shown in the costume traditionally worn by Santa Claus, especially at children's events.

List of Yule Lads
The Yule Lads arrive over the course of the last 13 nights before Christmas, beginning on 12 December. One then departs each day, beginning on Christmas Day, in the order that they arrived; thus each of them stays for 13 days. Below are the canonical 13 Yule Lads in the order they arrive (and depart):

Names in English are based on Hallberg Hallmundsson's translation of the poem.

Obscure Yule Lads
Before these 13 Yule Lads became the most popular, their description varied between locations. Some were said to be sons of Grýla; others were her brothers. Some stories only describe nine Yule Lads, but every one of them had their own characteristic prank.

Most of the different Yule Lads can be classified into groups: those who steal food, those who like to play tricks or harass, and those who seem to be a delusion from nature (for example, Gully Gawk, who just hides in gullies).

In the east of Iceland, there existed a folk tale of a specific group of Yule Lads. They did not come from the mountains but the ocean. One very obscure nursery rhyme mentions two female Yule pranksters who steal melted fat by either stuffing it up their noses or putting it in socks.

Notes

References

Further reading 
 
  Pictures by Halldor Petursson ca. 1950.
 
 
  A translation of the poem by Jóhannes úr Kötlum.
  A comprehensive site on Christmas in Iceland with much information about Yule Lads and Grýla.
 

Icelandic folklore
Christmas in Iceland